, better known as , is a Japanese actress represented by Stardust Promotion.

Filmography

TV series

NHK

Nippon TV

Tokyo Broadcasting System

Fuji Television

TV Asahi

TV Tokyo

Kansai Telecasting Corporation

Films

Dubbing

Bibliography

Books

References

External links
 

1963 births
Living people
Actresses from Tokyo
Stardust Promotion artists